Crosswell Glacier is a glacier  long, flowing north-northeast from Mount Shinn between Sullivan Heights and Bearskin Ridge, in the central part of the Sentinel Range, Ellsworth Mountains, Antarctica. Together with Patton and Pulpudeva Glaciers, it enters Ellen Glacier northwest of Mamarchev Peak and southeast of Mount Jumper.

The glacier was first mapped by the United States Geological Survey from surveys and from U.S. Navy air photos, 1957–59, and named by the Advisory Committee on Antarctic Names for Colonel Horace A. Crosswell, United States Air Force, leader of C-124 Globemaster air drops in establishing the scientific station at the South Pole in the 1956–57 season.

Tributary glaciers
 Ramorino Glacier
 Cervellati Glacier

See also
 List of glaciers in the Antarctic
 Glaciology

Maps
 Vinson Massif.  Scale 1:250 000 topographic map.  Reston, Virginia: US Geological Survey, 1988.
 Antarctic Digital Database (ADD). Scale 1:250000 topographic map of Antarctica. Scientific Committee on Antarctic Research (SCAR). Since 1993, regularly updated.

References 

 

Glaciers of Ellsworth Land